Lakhan Singh (born 21 August 1998) is an Indian cricketer. He made his List A debut for Services in the 2017–18 Vijay Hazare Trophy on 5 February 2018.

References

External links
 

1998 births
Living people
Indian cricketers
Place of birth missing (living people)
Meghalaya cricketers
Services cricketers